The Never Ending Tour is the popular name for Bob Dylan's endless touring schedule since June 7, 1988.

Information
The Never Ending Tour 1997 started in Japan in February. The tour was made up of eleven dates including three in Tokyo and two in Osaka.

Dylan travelled to North America to perform six concerts in Canada and nineteen concerts in the United States in the spring, including a performance at the Memphis In May festival on May 2. The tour ended in Huntsville, Alabama the following day.

The tour was interrupted in 1997 when Dylan was forced to cancel dates after suffering a serious medical issue in May. Columbia Records announced he was being hospitalized for a potentially fatal chest infection, histoplasmosis. Dylan continued to tour the United States throughout August.

In early October Dylan and the band travelled to the United Kingdom to perform three concerts in England and one in Wales. These were the only performances in Europe in 1997.

Dylan then returned to the United States to perform more concerts. The tour started in Starkville, Mississippi and came to an end in San Jose, California. Shortly after completing this tour, Dylan set out on tour again, this time performing in small club venues.

Shows

Festivals and other miscellaneous performances
This concert was a part of "Memphis in May".
This concert was a part of "Spirit Fest".

Cancellations and rescheduled shows

References

External links

BobLinks – Comprehensive log of concerts and set lists
Bjorner's Still on the Road – Information on recording sessions and performances

Bob Dylan concert tours
1997 concert tours